Tangen is a village in Stange Municipality in Innlandet county, Norway.

The Dovrebanen railway line runs through the village, stopping at Tangen Station. The European route E6 highway runs along the east side of Tangen.

Notable people
Odvar Nordli, former Prime Minister of Norway, was born and raised in Tangen.

References

Stange
Villages in Innlandet